The 76-mm regimental gun M1943 (OB-25) (Russian: 76-мм полковая пушка обр. 1943 г. (ОБ-25)) was a Soviet infantry support gun developed in 1943 by M. Yu. Tsiryulnikov at the ordnance plant in Motovilikha. The gun used a modernized barrel from the 76 mm regimental gun M1927 and the carriage from the 45 mm anti-tank gun M1942 (M-42). The gun was intended for destruction of light field fortifications and openly placed personnel by direct fire. HEAT shells gave it limited anti-armor capabilities. 76.2-mm regimental guns M1943 completely replaced M1927 guns in production that year and were built until the end of the German-Soviet War. Soon after the end of the war the production ceased due to insufficient range and muzzle velocity.

Ammunition
Ammunition types:
Fragmentation-HE: OF-350.
Fragmentation: O-350A.
HEAT: BP-350M.
Projectile weight:
OF-350: 6.2 kg.
Muzzle velocity:
OF-350, O-350A: 262 m/s.
BP-350M: 311 m/s.
Effective range:
OF-350, O-350A: 4,200 m.
BP-350M: 1,000 m.

Notes

References

 Chamberlain, Peter & Gander, Terry. Infantry, Mountain and Airborne Guns. New York: Arco, 1975
 Ivanov A. - Artillery of the USSR in Second World War - SPb Neva, 2003 (Иванов А. Артиллерия СССР во Второй Мировой войне. — СПб., Издательский дом Нева, 2003.)
 Shunkov V. N. - The Weapons of the Red Army, Mn. Harvest, 1999 (Шунков В. Н. - Оружие Красной Армии. — Мн.: Харвест, 1999.) 

World War II field artillery
World War II artillery of the Soviet Union
76 mm artillery
Motovilikha Plants products
Weapons and ammunition introduced in 1943